Krugersdorp Commando or Kommando was a light infantry regiment of the South African Army. It was active as a part of the South African Army Infantry Formation  as well as the South African Territorial Reserve.

Unit history

Origin
The Krugersdorp Commando, was formed in 1898 as part of the Boer Commando.

With the Zuid Afrikaanse Republiek

War against the Magato and Mpefu

Anglo Boer War
During the Anglo Boer War, this commando was involved in the following engagements:
 rearguard for Dundee
 Battle of Elandslaagte
 Battle of Modderspruit
 Battle of Colenso capturing General Buller's artillery
 Battle for Pietershoogte

During the guerilla phase of the war in the Western Transvaal, this commando was also involved in:
 Battle of Vlakfontein
 Battle of Moedswil
 Battle of Driefontein
 Battle of Yzerspruit
 Battle of Tweebosch
 Battle of Boschbult and 
 Battle of Roodewal

The battle of Nooitgedacht in the Krugersdorp area could have been a complete route had the Boers not stopped to plunder the British camp.

With the UDF
By 1902 all Commando remnants were under British military control and disarmed.

By 1912, however previous Commando members could join shooting associations.

By 1940, such commandos were under control of the National Reserve of Volunteers.

These commandos were formally reactivated by 1948.

With the SADF
During this era, the unit was mainly engaged in area force protection, search and cordones and stock theft control assistance to the rural police.

The unit resorted under the command of the SADF's Group 17.

With the SANDF

Disbandment
Krugersdorp Commando along with all other Commando units was disbanded in the 1990s after a decision by South African President Thabo Mbeki to disband all existing Commando Units. The Commando system was phased out between 2003 and 2008 "because of the role it played in the apartheid era", according to the Minister of Safety and Security Charles Nqakula.

Unit Insignia

Leadership

See also

South African Commando System

References

Infantry regiments of South Africa
South African Commando Units
Military units and formations of the Second Boer War